Michael Franks with Crossfire Live is a live jazz vocal album by Michael Franks featuring the Australian band Crossfire. It was recorded over a series of three concerts in Australia and New Zealand in September 1980; at the Capitol Theater in Sydney on the 25th, St James Tavern in Sydney on the 27th and The Town Hall in Auckland on the 29th.

The album was officially released in Australia and New Zealand in 1980 with Warner Music Australia, now Warner Music Australasia. 
It was re-released on CD in 2003 but is now out of production as a single album.

In 2012, a replica version of the album was included in the box set The Dream 1973-2011.

Track listing

Charts

Personnel

Performers with Crossfire
Michael Franks - vocals
Ian Bloxsom - percussion, mallets
Jim Kelly - guitar
Michael J. Kenny - acoustic piano, electric piano
Phil Scorgie - bass
Steve Hopes - drums 
Tony Buchanan - saxophone, flute

Support
Recording and mixing – Martin Benge

References

Bibliography

Michael Franks (musician) albums
Crossfire (band) albums
1980 live albums
Warner Music Group live albums